His Last Gift (also known as Last Present) is a 2008 South Korean film.

Plot 
Tae-joo, a murderer serving a life sentence in prison, is given a temporary release to save the life of a seriously ill young girl, Se-hee, who suffers from Wilson's disease and desperately needs a liver transplant. Se-hee is the daughter of Yeong-woo, an old friend of Tae-joo's who is now a police officer. Upon discovering that Se-hee's now deceased mother was his ex-wife, Tae-joo realises that he is in fact her biological father, and does everything he can to try and save her life.

Cast 
 Shin Hyun-joon ... Kang Tae-joo
 Heo Joon-ho ... Jo Yeong-woo
 Jo Soo-min ... Jo Se-hee
 Kwon Oh-joong ... Dong-hyeon
 Kim Sang-ho ... Yong-tae
 Jo Won-hee ... Cheol-goo
 Bang Hyeob ... Kang Tae-joo
 Choi Seong-ho ... Jo Yeong-woo
 Ha Ji-won ... Min Hye-yeong
 Kim Hyeon-ah ... Ha-jin
 Kim Ik-tae ... Taxi driver
 Cho Jin-woong ... Baek In-cheol
 Park Min-jung as Bar woman
 Lee Sang-hong ... Scamp
 Park So-yeon
 Gi Ju-bong ... Class monitor (cameo)
 Kim Myeong-gook ... Jo Yeong-woo's brother (cameo)

Release 
Prior to the release of the film, actors Shin Hyun-joon and Heo Joon-ho staged a charity concert in Seoul, intended to reflect on the main themes of the film. The concert was held on 
24 January 2008, at the Melon-X concert hall, and featured performances from K-pop artists Baek Ji-young and KCM, as well as actress Choi Ji-woo. Admission to the concert was free, with voluntary donations being made to the KBS TV charity program "Love Request".

His Last Gift was released in South Korea on February 5, 2008, and was ranked fifth at the box office on its opening weekend, grossing $983,555. By 2 March it had grossed a total of $1,857,015, and as of 10 February the total number of tickets sold was 228,120.

References

External links 
  
 
 
 

2008 films
2008 drama films
2000s Korean-language films
Medical-themed films
South Korean drama films
Showbox films
2000s South Korean films